The Nun may refer to:

Books
 The Nun, in French La Religieuse, an anti-Catholic novel by Denis Diderot, 1760
 The Nun, an anti-Catholic novel by Mary Martha Sherwood, 1833

Film
 The Nun (1966 film), a 1966 drama film directed by Jacques Rivette, based on the Diderot novel
 The Nun (2005 film), a 2005 horror film directed by Luis De La Madrid
 The Nun (2013 film), a 2013 French film
 The Nun (2018 film), an American horror film and part of The Conjuring franchise

Other
 The Nuns, a U.S. punk band
 "The Nun", a 1985 episode of the TV sitcom Night Court
 The Flying Nuns, early stage name for professional wrestling tag-team The Headbangers

See also
 Nun (disambiguation)